Mark Brennan (born 1968) is a Canadian landscape artist. Mark Brennan’s work is an exploration of the human connection to the landscape. He situates himself along the edge of the divide between human interaction with the land and remaining wild places.

"I believe there is a subconscious interaction between all of us and the places we live. The stories of our lives and the way in which each of us connects to one another are deeply influenced by our understanding of the places and processes we come into contact with".

"I sometimes get this sense that through my work, I am attempting to express a deeper understanding of both wild places and the how humans interact with their surroundings and each other. When I paint or photograph, I am driven by both past memory and experiences in the natural areas as a child, I feel as if I am seeking some kind of perfection or beauty through art".

Marks formal study period took place in the Royal Navy where he was exposed to many forms of photography as the ship photographer.

Early life
Brennan was born in Swindon, England in 1968. He grew up on the West Coast of Scotland, where he spent much of his time exploring the Scottish Highlands. At the age of 19 he emigrated to Pictou County in Nova Scotia, Canada,  and painted his first landscape in the early 1990s at Perch Lake near Trafalgar, Nova Scotia.

Career
Brennan's main focus has been to record Canada's wilderness areas and National Parks through landscape painting. From 2016 to 2020, he recorded the changing Nova Scotia coastline using analog photographic equipment. He photographed its diverse and unique landscapes from the Northern tip of Cape Breton Island to its most Southern point, Seal Island, A portion of this series has been gathered into this small book as a collection that stands as part of the artistic narrative of this Eastern Canadian province.

In 2006 he ran for the federal Green Party as a parachute candidate in the riding of Random, Burin, St George's, Newfoundland.

His work can be found in the Nova Scotia Government Public Art Bank Collection. In October 2009 he was included in the book From Land & Sea, Nova Scotia's Contemporary Landscape Artists, published by Nimbus Publishing.

References

External links 
 Mark Brennan
 CBC Canada Votes Election  Coverage 2006
 Canadian Heritage Information Network, Artists in Canada

20th-century Canadian painters
Canadian male painters
21st-century Canadian painters
Canadian landscape painters
Canadian people of Scottish descent
Newfoundland and Labrador candidates for Member of Parliament
1968 births
Living people
20th-century Canadian male artists
21st-century Canadian male artists